The People's Supermarket is a community interest company whose stated aim is to provide the local community with good cheap food that is fair to consumers and producers. It was founded in May 2010 by Arthur Potts Dawson with regeneration advisor/entrepreneur David Barrie and retail specialist Kate Wickes-Bull, supported by a team of supporters and professional advisors, in Lamb's Conduit Street, Holborn, London, England, near Great Ormond Street Hospital.  it had 1000 members.

Based upon the concept of the food co-operative and inspired in part by the Park Slope Food Coop in the Park Slope neighbourhood of Brooklyn in New York City, US, members of the social enterprise are required to pay a £25 annual fee and contribute four hours of their time every four weeks to working in the store. In return, members receive a 20% discount off their shopping in-store.

History

The People's Supermarket was opened May 2010, designed to enable healthy food to be supplied to an inner city urban community at affordable prices and inspired by peoples' willingness to exchange their time for other value. It was founded as a cooperative and changed its legal status in September 2013 to a community interest company.

The supermarket provides the area of Holborn, London, with a unique combination of grocery store, production kitchen and events, such as supper clubs. It formed part of and supported the development of Lamb's Conduit Street, Holborn, which has featured the arrival of independent fashion shops and a branch of global brand J.Crew.

For its innovative approach to food, community involvement and local development, the venture has won several awards, including Future Minds Award for Innovation (2011) and an Observer Ethical Award (2011).

The venture was supported at start-up by many organisations, including the London Borough of Camden, Esmée Fairbairn Foundation and Fredericks Foundation, private companies and many local people. In 2011, it was visited by Prime Minister of the United Kingdom, David Cameron, as a flagship of the Big Society initiative.

Media

The People's Supermarket was the subject of a four-episode February 2011 Channel 4 documentary series which followed chef and eco-restaurateur Arthur Potts Dawson's journey to launch a supermarket owned by its customers in order to compete with the UK's Big 4 Supermarkets. Founding members and local residents appear on the programmes. The series was produced by Wall to Wall Media.

The People's Supermarket was discussed on BBC Radio 4's You and Yours on 15 July 2010.

The story of its development and a detailed description of its operating and business model has been published by Nesta.

Episodes

See also
 List of food cooperatives

References

External links

2011 British television series debuts
2011 British television series endings
Business-related television series in the United Kingdom
Channel 4 documentary series
Food reality television series
Food cooperatives in the United Kingdom
Co-operatives in the United Kingdom